Jeffers Glacier is southeast of Mount Olympus in the Olympic Mountains in Olympic National Park, Washington, US. The glacier is relatively small compared to the nearby Hoh Glacier. Meltwater from the terminus flows to the Queets River. 

The Jeffers Glacier is named for Olympia photographer Joseph Jeffers, who died after falling into a crevasse there in 1924.

See also
List of glaciers in the United States

References

Glaciers of the Olympic Mountains
Glaciers of Jefferson County, Washington
Glaciers of Washington (state)